Caenorhabditis wallacei - prior to 2014 referred to as C. sp. 16, is a species of Caenorhabditis nematodes. The type isolate was collected in Central Bali, Indonesia.

C. wallacei groups in phylogenetic trees with C. tropicalis, in the 'Elegans' supergroup.

References

External links 

wallacei
Nematodes described in 2014
Fauna of Indonesia
Fauna of Bali